The silver-ground carpet (Xanthorhoe montanata) is a moth of the family Geometridae. The species was first described by Michael Denis and Ignaz Schiffermüller in 1775. It is common throughout the Palearctic region (from Ireland to the Russian Far East but not Japan) including the Near East and North Africa.It is found in a variety of different habitats and occurs, for example, in humid forests, moorland and shore areas, on embankments or on unimproved grass meadows and heathlands as well as in gardens.

The wingspan is 29–33 mm although some northern races may be smaller. The forewings are white with a broad shaded band which varies from pale grey to almost black. The hindwings are also white with pale fascia and a small black discal spot.

In The Macrolepidoptera of the World Louis Beethoven Prout wrote:

The species flies from May to July, usually at dusk. It will come to light but is not strongly attracted.

The larva is grey with a purplish-brown back. It has been recorded feeding on bedstraw, Corydalis, globeflower, hemlock and primrose and probably feeds on other low-growing plants. The species overwinters as a larva.

The flight season refers to the British Isles. This may vary in other parts of the range.

Subspecies 
X. m. iberica
X. m. lapponica
X. m. montanata
X. m. shetlandica

References

Chinery, Michael Collins Guide to the Insects of Britain and Western Europe 1986 (Reprinted 1991)
Skinner, Bernard Colour Identification Guide to Moths of the British Isles 1984

External links

Silver-ground carpet at UKMoths

Lepiforum e.V.

Xanthorhoe
Moths described in 1775
Moths of Europe
Moths of Asia
Moths of Africa
Taxa named by Michael Denis
Taxa named by Ignaz Schiffermüller